The Governor of Pitcairn is the representative of the British monarch in the Pitcairn Islands, the last remaining British Overseas Territory in the Pacific Ocean. Despite technically being under the authority of the colonial governor, Pitcairn has local autonomy.

Because of the dependency's small population (it peaked at 233 in the 1930s, and has since dwindled to 50), the British never considered it worthwhile to station a resident governor on Pitcairn. Instead, the Governor of Fiji doubled as governor of Pitcairn from 1898 onward. When Fiji became independent in 1970, the governorship of Pitcairn was transferred to the British high commissioner to New Zealand. The office is currently held by Iona Thomas.

Throughout the island's history, the authority of the British governor was almost never used. An exception was Governor Richard Fell's dismissal of Mayor Steve Christian, who was convicted in the Pitcairn sexual assault trial of 2004.

List of governors since 1970

See also
List of rulers of the Pitcairn Islands, for local rulers since 1790
List of governors of Fiji, for governors from 1898 until 1970
List of high commissioners of the United Kingdom to New Zealand, for governors since 1970

References

Government of the Pitcairn Islands
Politics of the Pitcairn Islands
Pitcairn Islands
 
1898 establishments in the Pitcairn Islands